Lois Conner (born 1951) is an American photographer. She is noted particularly for her platinum print landscapes that she produces with a 7" x 17" format banquet camera.

Early life
Conner was born in New York City in 1951 and grew up in southern Pennsylvania. She dedicated herself to the arts from a young age: learning about photography from her father at 9 years old, apprenticing with a painter as a teenager, and later studying fashion design and taking dance, art, and photography classes in New York City. Conner credits Philippe Halsman, her photography teacher at The New School, for her ultimately choosing to study photography.

Education
Lois Conner received her BFA in photography from the Pratt Institute. At Yale University, where she received her MFA in 1981, she met and studied with Tod Papageorge and Richard Benson. She moved to New York City in 1971 where she worked for the United Nations until 1984.

Exhibitions
The Sackler Gallery in Washington (National Museum of Art) presented a retrospective of her work, Landscape as Culture, in 1994. Among her other exhibitions were solo shows Asie-la ligne du paysage (1997) in Lausanne, Switzerland, The Silk Road: Trade, Travel, War and Faith (2005) and Twirling the Lotus: Photographs of China and Tibet (2007) in London, Beijing: Unfurling the Landscape (2014) at Australian National University, and A Long View at the Shanghai Center of Photography (2018). Recent work has included a series of portraits of pregnant women.

Publications

Books of work by Conner
China, The Photographs of Lois Conner. Callaway Arts & Entertainment, 2000. .
Lois Conner Photographs. 2003.
Twirling the Lotus. 2007.
Life In A Box. 2011.
Beijing Building. London. Rossi & Rossi, 2011. .
Beijing: Contemporary and Imperial. Princeton Architectural Press, 2014. .
LOST, Beijing. Kris Graves Projects, 2018.
Lotus Leaves. New Zealand. Wairarpa Academy Occasional Publication No. 1, 2018. .

 Upcoming publications include: American Trees (Yale University Art Gallery) and Beijing Spectacle-Ruination and Reinvention.

Collections
Conner's work is included in the collections of the Museum of Modern Art, the Metropolitan Museum of Art, the Sackler Gallery in Washington, D.C., the Smithsonian American Art Museum, the Australian National Gallery in Canberra, the Victoria and Albert Museum in London and the British Library.

Awards
Conner was awarded John Simon Guggenheim Memorial Foundation grants in 1984 and 1985, which enabled her to photograph in China. She was also the recipient of a National Endowment for the Arts Fellowship and the Anonymous Was a Woman fellowship.

Bibliography
 Beijing: Contemporary and Imperial (2014), Princeton Architectural Press,

References

 Davis, Keith F. 'Wanderlust: Work by Eight Contemporary Photographers from the Hallmark Photographic Collection' (Kansas City: Hallmark, 1987), 81.
 Feinberg, Jean E. 'Wave Hill Pictured: Celebration of a Garden' (New York: Harry N. Abrams, 1991), 17-21.
 Princeton University; The Program in Visual Arts; Faculty, s.v. "Lois Conner". Accessed 23 November 2007.
 Union List of Artist Names, s.v. "Conner, Lois". Accessed 10 September 2006.

1951 births
American photographers
Living people
China Academy of Art
Yale School of Art alumni
Pratt Institute alumni
Artists from New York City
Sarah Lawrence College faculty
American women photographers
National Endowment for the Arts Fellows
American women academics
21st-century American women